Potter County is a county in the U.S. state of South Dakota. As of the 2020 census, the population was 2,472. Its county seat is Gettysburg. The county was created in 1873 and organized in 1883.

Geography
The Missouri River flows southward along the west boundary line of Potter County. The county terrain consists of rolling hills, mostly devoted to agriculture. The county generally slopes to the south, although the western portion slopes into the river valley.

The eastern portion of South Dakota's counties (48 of 66) observe Central Time; the western counties (18 of 66) observe Mountain Time. Potter County is the westernmost of the SD counties to observe Central Time.

Major highways

 U.S. Highway 83
 U.S. Highway 212
 South Dakota Highway 20
 South Dakota Highway 47
 South Dakota Highway 1804

Adjacent counties

 Walworth County - north
 Edmunds County - northeast
 Faulk County - east
 Hyde County - southeast
 Sully County - south
 Dewey County - west (observes Mountain Time)

Protected areas
 Dodge Draw State Game Production Area
 Dodge Draw State Lakeside Use Area
 East Whitlock State Lakeside Use Area
 Forest City State Game Production Area
 Green Lake State Game Production Area
 Potts Dam State Game Production Area
 Siebrasse State Game Production Area
 West Whitlock State Recreation Area
 Whitlocks Bay State Game Production Area

Lakes
 Green Lake
 Lake Hurley
 Lake Oahe (part)

Demographics

2000 census
As of the 2000 United States Census, there were 2,693 people, 1,145 households, and 767 families in the county. The population density was 3 people per square mile (1/km2). There were 1,760 housing units at an average density of 2 per square mile (1/km2).  The racial makeup of the county was 98.14% White, 0.82% Native American, 0.19% Asian, 0.07% from other races, and 0.78% from two or more races. 0.19% of the population were Hispanic or Latino of any race.

There were 1,145 households, out of which 26.60% had children under the age of 18 living with them, 59.20% were married couples living together, 4.90% had a female householder with no husband present, and 33.00% were non-families. 31.30% of all households were made up of individuals, and 17.50% had someone living alone who was 65 years of age or older. The average household size was 2.29 and the average family size was 2.88.

The county population contained 23.00% under the age of 18, 3.90% from 18 to 24, 22.30% from 25 to 44, 25.70% from 45 to 64, and 25.00% who were 65 years of age or older. The median age was 46 years. For every 100 females there were 96.70 males. For every 100 females age 18 and over, there were 94.80 males.

The median income for a household in the county was $30,086, and the median income for a family was $37,827. Males had a median income of $25,320 versus $16,563 for females. The per capita income for the county was $17,417. About 8.90% of families and 12.60% of the population were below the poverty line, including 18.00% of those under age 18 and 12.30% of those age 65 or over.

2010 census
As of the 2010 United States Census, there were 2,329 people, 1,062 households, and 648 families in the county. The racial makeup of the county was 97.6% white, 0.9% American Indian, 0.3% Asian, 0.1% black or African American, 0.2% from other races, and 0.9% from two or more races. Those of Hispanic or Latino origin made up 0.7% of the population. In terms of ancestry, 65.3% were German, 11.1% were Irish, 8.2% were Norwegian, 8.0% were English, and 3.9% were American.

Of the 1,062 households, 21.7% had children under the age of 18 living with them, 53.0% were married couples living together, 4.2% had a female householder with no husband present, 39.0% were non-families, and 35.5% of all households were made up of individuals. The average household size was 2.13 and the average family size was 2.76. The median age was 50.6 years.

The median income for a household in the county was $42,422 and the median income for a family was $53,214. Males had a median income of $33,750 versus $29,792 for females. The per capita income for the county was $23,986. About 5.4% of families and 10.0% of the population were below the poverty line, including 11.7% of those under age 18 and 10.8% of those age 65 or over.

Communities

City
 Gettysburg (county seat)

Towns
 Hoven
 Lebanon
 Tolstoy

Unincorporated area
 Forest City

Townships
The county has no organized townships. It is divided into three areas of unorganized territory: West Potter, Central Potter, and East Potter.

Politics
Like most of South Dakota outside of Native American counties, Potter County has been predominantly Republican throughout most of the state's history. Only three Democrats – William Jennings Bryan, Franklin D. Roosevelt and Lyndon Johnson – have carried the county as of 2020, and since Jimmy Carter in 1976 no Democrat has passed forty percent of the county's vote.

See also
 National Register of Historic Places listings in Potter County, South Dakota
 Herman Malchow

References

 
1883 establishments in Dakota Territory
Populated places established in 1883